William Constantine Culbertson (November 25, 1825 – May 24, 1906) was a Republican member of the U.S. House of Representatives from Pennsylvania.

William C. Culbertson was born in Edinboro, Pennsylvania.  He attended the common schools of his native town.  He was engaged in lumbering on the Allegheny River in Jefferson County, Pennsylvania, and also operated a mill and a factory at Covington, Kentucky. He owned slaves.  He moved to Girard, Pennsylvania, in 1863.  He purchased extensive tracts of timberland in Michigan, Wisconsin, and other States, and later became interested in agricultural pursuits in Minnesota and in his native county.  He served as president of the Citizens' National Bank of Corry, Pennsylvania.

Culbertson was elected as a Republican to the Fifty-first Congress.  He was an unsuccessful candidate for renomination in 1890.  He resumed his former business activities and died in Girard in 1906.  Interment in Girard Cemetery.

Sources

The Political Graveyard

1825 births
1906 deaths
Politicians from Erie, Pennsylvania
American people of Scottish descent
Republican Party members of the United States House of Representatives from Pennsylvania
Businesspeople from Pennsylvania
Businesspeople from Kentucky
American slave owners
19th-century American politicians